The Sword of Islam is a 1987 British documentary film directed by David Darlow and produced by Granada Television.

Synopsis 
The Sword of Islam explores the world of Muslim fundamentalists.

Awards

References

External links 
 

1987 films
British television documentaries
British documentary films
ITV documentaries
1980s English-language films
1980s British films